Gabriël  is the Dutch spelling of Gabriel. People with this name include:

Gabriël van België (born 2003), Belgian prince
Gabriël Grupello (1644–1730), Flemish sculptor
Gabriël van der Hofstadt (1620–1690), Flemish painter
Gabriël Marselis (1609–1673), Dutch merchant and land owner
Gabriël Metsu (1629–1667), Dutch painter
Gabriël van der Muyden (c.1500–1560), Flemish jurist and humanist
 (1757–1836), Dutch theologian
 (1910–1981), Dutch poet, essayist, playwright, editor and politician
Gabriël, one of the pseudonyms used by Dutch novelist Carel van Nievelt (1843–1913)

See also
Gabriel (disambiguation)
Gabriëls

Dutch masculine given names